Mahmud IV, also known as Mahamud Hawadane (Xawadane), was a Somali ruler. He was among the earliest Sultans of the Majeerteen Sultanate.

Reign
The Majeerteen Sultanate was established around 1800 CE by Somalis from the Majeerteen Harti Darod clan. It reached prominence during the 19th century, under the reign of the resourceful Boqor (King) Osman Mahamuud.

Mahmud IV reigned from an unknown date of accession to 1815. He was succeeded atop the throne by `Uthman II.

See also
Somali aristocratic and court titles

References

Ethnic Somali people
19th-century Somalian people
Majeerteen Sultanate
Somali sultans